The Minister of Food Control (1916–1921) and the Minister of Food (1939–1958) were British government ministerial posts separated from that of the Minister of Agriculture. In the Great War the Ministry sponsored a network of canteens known as National Kitchens. In the Second World War a major task of the Ministry was to oversee rationing in the United Kingdom arising out of World War II. The Minister was assisted by a Parliamentary Secretary. The Parliamentary Under Secretary of State for Food and Animal Welfare (2018–present) was appointed at the Department for the Environment, Food and Rural Affairs to ensure the continued supply of sufficient food during the Brexit process.

The ministry's work was transferred in 1921 to the Board of Trade which had a small Food Department between the wars.  This became its Food (Defence Plans) Department in 1937 and was then constituted as the Ministry of Food on the outbreak of war in 1939.

Jamie's Ministry of Food was a 2008 UK TV programme featuring celebrity chef Jamie Oliver that aimed to recreate the successes of the Ministry of Food in encouraging healthy eating.

Second World War

In April 1940 Lord Woolton, a prominent businessman, was appointed Minister of Food by Neville Chamberlain, one of a number of ministerial appointments from outside politics. Woolton retained this position until 1943. He supervised 50,000 employees and over a thousand local offices where people could obtain ration cards. His ministry had a virtual monopoly of all food sold in Britain, whether imported or local. His mission was to guarantee adequate nutrition for everyone. With food supplies cut sharply because of enemy action and the needs of the services, rationing was essential. Woolton and his advisors had one scheme in mind but economists convinced them to try point rationing. Everyone would have a certain number of points a month that they could allocate any way they wanted. They tried an experiment and it worked very well. Indeed, food rationing was a major success story in Britain's war.

In the dark days of late June 1940, with a German invasion threatened, Woolton reassured the public that emergency food stocks were in place that would last "for weeks and weeks" even if the shipping could not get through. He said "iron rations" were stored for use only in great emergency. Other rations were stored in the outskirts of cities liable to German bombing. When the Blitz began in late summer 1940 he was ready with more than 200 feeding stations in London and other cities under attack.

Woolton was faced with the task of overseeing rationing due to wartime shortages. He took the view that it was insufficient to merely impose restrictions but that a programme of advertising to support it was also required. He warned that meat and cheese, as well as bacon and eggs, were in very short supply and would remain that way. Calling for a simpler diet, he noted that there was plenty of bread, potatoes, vegetable oils, fats and milk. He asked the mathematician Martin Roseveare to design the ration books.

In 1940 Woolton set up Advice Centres throughout the country, with cookery demonstrations and recipe leaflets showing how to make the best use of rations. As imported wheat became scarce, the cartoon character 'Potato Pete' encouraged people to eat more potatoes.

By January 1941 the usual overseas food supply had fallen to half what it had been. However, by 1942 ample food supplies were arriving through Lend Lease from the U.S. and a similar Canadian programme. Lend Lease was a gift and there was no charge. Most food was now rationed. Worried about children, Lord Woolton made sure that by 1942 Britain was providing 650,000 children with free meals at schools; about 3,500,000 children received milk at school, in addition to priority supplies at home. The bad news was that his "national loaf" of mushy grey wholemeal bread replaced the ordinary white variety, to the distaste of most housewives. Children were sad to learn that supplies of sweets were reduced to save shipping space on sugar and chocolate.

Woolton kept food prices down; eggs and other items were subsidised. He promoted recipes that worked well with the rationing system, most famously the meatless "Woolton pie" which consisted of carrots, parsnips, potatoes and turnips in oatmeal, with a pastry or potato crust and served with brown gravy. Woolton's business skills made the Ministry of Food's difficult job a success and he earned a strong personal popularity despite the shortages.

List of Ministers of Food

Ministers of Food Control (1916–1921)

Responsibilities transferred to the Board of Trade 1921–1939.

Ministers of Food (1939–1958)

Heathcoat-Amory jointly held the separate posts of Minister of Agriculture & Fisheries and Minister of Food 1954–55, pending their merger in 1955 when he assumed the post of Minister of Agriculture, Fisheries and Food.

Parliamentary Under Secretary of State for Food and Animal Welfare (2018–present)

References

Further reading
 
 
  Hammond, R. J. Food, Volume 1: The Growth of Policy (London: HMSO, 1951); Food, Volume 2: Studies in Administration and Control (1956); Food, Volume 3: Studies in Administration and Control (1962) official war history
 Hammond, R. J. Food and Agriculture in Britain, 1939-45: Aspects of wartime control (Food, agriculture, and World War II) (1954) 
Rankin, H. F. (1922) Imbucase: the Story of the B. C. I. C. of the Ministry of Food. Edinburgh: Edinburgh Press (B.C.I.C.=Butter and Cheese Imports Committee)
 
 Zweiniger-Bargielowska, Ina. Austerity in Britain: Rationing, Controls & Consumption, 1939-1955 (2000) 286 p. online

Food
Defunct ministerial offices in the United Kingdom
United Kingdom home front during World War II